In the U.S. military, go pills and no-go pills refers to stimulant medications meant to increase wakefulness and hypnotic medications taken to ensure adequate rest in preparation for upcoming tasks. As of November 2012, medications approved as no-go pills by the U.S. Air Force for Special Operations include:

 Temazepam (Restoril), with a 12-hour restriction on subsequent flight operation
 Zaleplon (Sonata), with a 4-hour restriction on subsequent flight operation
 Zolpidem (Ambien), with a 6-hour restriction on subsequent flight operation

Go pill

In contrast to the sleeping agents, a go pill refers to a wakefulness-promoting agent used for fatigue management, especially in a military combat-readiness context; this is contrasted with a no-go pill, which is used to promote sleep in support of combat operations. A go pill generally contains one of the following drugs:
 Amphetamine (methamphetamine having been used historically, such as during the Second World War), which is a strong psychostimulant drug; no longer approved officially for use by the U.S. Air Force, possibly due to safety concerns brought up in the wake of incidents like the Tarnak Farm incident.
 Modafinil, a wakefulness-promoting drug (or eugeroic)

References

Hypnotics and sedatives
Psychoactive drugs and the military